Stig Rasch (born 4 July 1967) is a Norwegian handball player.

He made his debut on the Norwegian national team in 1993, 
and played 81 matches for the national team between 1993 and 2001. He competed at the 1999 World Men's Handball Championship in Egypt.

References

1967 births
Living people
Norwegian male handball players